Kateryna Yuriyivna Samson (born 5 July 1988) is a Ukrainian footballer who plays as a goalkeeper for Hungarian club Győri ETO FC and the Ukraine women's national team. She previously played in the Ukrainian League for Naftokhimik Kalush and Lehenda Chernihiv, and in the Champions League with Lehenda Chernihiv.

References

External links

1988 births
Living people
Sportspeople from Sumy
Women's association football goalkeepers
Ukrainian women's footballers
WFC Spartak Sumy players
WFC Naftokhimik Kalush players
WFC Lehenda-ShVSM Chernihiv players
Zvezda 2005 Perm players
Ryazan-VDV players
WFC Zhytlobud-2 Kharkiv players
Győri ETO FC players
Russian Women's Football Championship players
Ukraine women's international footballers
Ukrainian expatriate women's footballers
Ukrainian expatriate sportspeople in Russia
Expatriate women's footballers in Russia
Ukrainian expatriate sportspeople in Hungary
Expatriate women's footballers in Hungary